Jennifer Ann Johnson is assistant professor of sociology at Virginia Commonwealth University, and one of the chief editors of the journal Sexualization, Media, and Society.

Education 
Johnson received her BS in sociology from Radford University in 1985, her MS in sociology from Virginia Commonwealth University in 1993, and her PhD in sociology from the University of Virginia in 2004. Her doctoral thesis was entitled The Geography of Gender: Ritual as Residence.

Bibliography

Books

Chapters in books

Journal articles 
 
 
 
 
 
  Pdf.

References

External links 
 Profile page: Jennifer A. Johnson Virginia Commonwealth University

Year of birth missing (living people)
Living people
Place of birth missing (living people)
Radford University alumni
Virginia Commonwealth University alumni
University of Virginia alumni
American mass media scholars
American sociologists
American women sociologists
American women academics
Gender studies academics
Mass media theorists
Virginia Commonwealth University faculty